Ryan O'Marra (born June 9, 1987) is a Canadian former professional ice hockey player. O'Marra played professionally from 2006 until 2015. A first round pick of the New York Islanders of the National Hockey League (NHL), O'Marra played 33 games in the NHL and finished his career playing in European leagues.

Early life
O'Marra was born to Irish Canadian parents in Tokyo, Japan, and moved to Canada when he was one year old. O'Marra was also a student at Athabasca University.

Playing career

Amateur
O'Marra attended Mentor College Primary School and Lorne Park Secondary School both in Mississauga, Ontario. As a minor ice hockey player in his youth, he participated in the 2000 and 2001 Quebec International Pee-Wee Hockey Tournaments with the North York Rangers, and the Toronto Marlboros teams.

O'Marra played three seasons in the Ontario Hockey League (OHL) for the Erie Otters. In two seasons with the Otters, he has earned 95 points (41 goals and 54 assists) in 127 regular season games. He has also scored 15 points (nine goals and six assists) in 15 playoff games with the Otters. O'Marra was then drafted in the first round, 15th overall, by the New York Islanders in the 2005 NHL Entry Draft. He became the first Japanese-born Canadian player selected in the first round of an NHL Entry Draft.

Professional
On March 30, 2006, at the conclusion of the 2005–06 season, O'Marra was signed to a three-year contract by the New York Islanders. He then joined the Islanders' American Hockey League (AHL) affiliate, the Bridgeport Sound Tigers, scoring two goals in his professional debut. 

O'Marra was then returned to the Otters for his final junior-eligible season, in 2006–07. The Otters got off to a slow start, and he was traded to the Saginaw Spirit in late November in exchange for promising centre Zack Torquato. On February 27, 2007, O'Marra's NHL rights were dealt in a trade to the Edmonton Oilers, along with Robert Nilsson and the Islanders' first-round draft pick in the 2007 (Alex Plante), in exchange for Ryan Smyth.

After two difficult seasons with the Oilers' minor league affiliates, the Springfield Falcons and Stockton Thunder, O'Marra made his NHL debut with Edmonton in the 2009–10 season. He played six minutes and was a –1 plus-minus in a game against the Ottawa Senators on November 10, 2009. O'Marra later recorded his first career NHL point on an assist of a Colin McDonald goal against the Vancouver Canucks, on November 28; the goal was also McDonald's first career NHL point. O'Marra scored his first career NHL goal on December 26, 2010, against Cory Schneider of the Canucks. On March 17, 2011, due to multiple injuries to Oilers players, O'Marra was again recalled to the NHL, along with fellow Oklahoma City Barons – Edmonton's new AHL affiliate – teammates Alexandre Giroux and Chris VandeVelde.

During the following season, 2011–12, O'Marra was traded to the Anaheim Ducks in exchange for Bryan Rodney on February 16, 2012.

On July 27, 2012, with the impending 2012–13 NHL lockout, O'Marra signed his first European contract on a one-year deal with Lahti Pelicans of the Finnish SM-liiga. However, after only eight games into the 2012–13 season and enduring a diminished role within the roster, O'Marra was mutually released from his contract on October 4, 2012. O'Marra then played nine games for HC Fassa in the Italian Serie A in the regular season before moving to Vålerenga in Norway for the rest of the regular season and playoffs. With Vålerenga, he had seven goals and six assists for 13 points in 15 games in the playoffs.

After playing one season in Italy with Val Pusteria HC, O'Marra signed with Elite Ice Hockey League (EIHL) team Coventry Blaze in the United Kingdom for the 2014–15 season. After playing one season with the Blaze, O'Marra announced his retirement from professional ice hockey on March 26, 2015.

He continued to play hockey in Alberta at the senior men's level with the Stoney Creek Generals of the Allan Cup Hockey.

International play

O'Marra played in his first international tournament with Canada Ontario in the 2004 World U-17 Hockey Challenge, defeating Canada Pacific to earn the gold medal. He then won a gold medal as the alternate captain for Team Canada at the 2004 U-18 Junior World Cup. He also played on the Canadian under-18 team that finished with a silver medal at the 2005 IIHF World U18 Championships in Plzeň, Czech Republic.

O'Marra was selected and played a part of the consecutive gold medal-winning Canadian teams at the 2006 and 2007 World Junior Ice Hockey Championships.

Career statistics

Regular season and playoffs

International

References

External links

1987 births
Anaheim Ducks players
Athabasca University alumni
Bridgeport Sound Tigers players
Canadian ice hockey centres
Canadian people of Irish descent
Coventry Blaze players
Edmonton Oilers players
Erie Otters players
SHC Fassa players
Living people
National Hockey League first-round draft picks
New York Islanders draft picks
Oklahoma City Barons players
Lahti Pelicans players
HC Pustertal Wölfe players
Saginaw Spirit players
Sportspeople from Tokyo
Springfield Falcons players
Stockton Thunder players
Syracuse Crunch players
Vålerenga Ishockey players
Canadian expatriate ice hockey players in England
Canadian expatriate ice hockey players in Norway
Canadian expatriate ice hockey players in Italy
Canadian expatriate ice hockey players in Finland